The Reserva Provincial La Payunia also known as Payún or Payén is a natural reserve located in the Malargüe Department in the southern part of Mendoza Province, Argentina, about 160 km away from Malargüe city. It was declared as nature preserve in 1988 and has an area of 4,500 km2. La Payunia is home to the many volcanic cones, being noteworthy the Payún Matrú volcano.

Biodiversity 

Flora:
The flora is represented by matorrales, prairies, native mountain species and other typical patagonian plants such as Adesmia pinifolia, Festuca pallescens, Grindelia chiloensis, Ephedra ochreata miers, Neosparton ephedroides grisebach, Psila spartioides, Prosopis denudans (between 500 and 1,300 m AMSL) and Schinus poligamun and Larrea nítida cavanilles (between 1,800 and 2,850 m AMSL).

Fauna:
Over 70 animal species have been documented on the reserve. Common bird species include the Andean condor Vultur gryphus, Darwin's rhea Rhea pennata, and flamingo. Reptiles include venomous snakes such as the Patagonian pit viper Bothrops ammodytoides and crossed pit viper Bothrops alternatus. Predators include the mountain lion Puma concolor, South American gray fox Pseudalopex griseus, culpeo fox Lycalopex culpaeus and pampas cat Leopardus pajeros. Other mammals include a large rodent, the plains viscacha Lagostomus maximus, and the largest native animal on the reserve, the guanaco Lama guanicoe. A cooperative of around 20 families, Cooperativa Payun Matru, live on the reserve. They round up the wild guanaco every year and shear the animals for their fur. The annual round up is monitored by the Wildlife Conservation Society, and wool and yarn are exported abroad.

Geography 
The area is covered by many small volcanoes, and the biggest are Payún Matrú, Payún Liso and Santa María. Volcanic ash forms a black terrain known as Pampas Negras (Spanish: Black Pampas).

The Grande River flows in the zone across volcanic rocks cracks.

References

External links 
 Volcanes de Reserva at Página/12
 La Payunia description and video
 Accesses
 La Payunia Reserve

Protected areas of Mendoza Province
Nature reserves in Argentina